Darmian Rural District is in the Central District of Darmian County, South Khorasan province, Iran. At the National Census of 2006, its population was 7,306 in 1,809 households. There were 7,640 inhabitants in 1,985 households at the following census of 2011. At the most recent census of 2016, the population of the rural district was 8,279 in 2,185 households. The largest of its 65 villages was Darmian, with 1,657 people.

References 

Darmian County

Rural Districts of South Khorasan Province

Populated places in South Khorasan Province

Populated places in Darmian County